Garvin is a town in McCurtain County, Oklahoma, United States. The population was 256 at the 2010 census, compared to 143 in 2000.

History
A post office named Garvin was established at the trading post on February 19, 1894. James W. Kirk, owner of the trading post, was the first postmaster, and chose to name the post office "Garvin," after his father-in-law, Isaac L. Garvin, who had been chief of the Choctaw Nation from 1878 to 1880.

At the time of its founding, Garvin was located in Bok Tuklo County, a part of the Apukshunnubbee District of the Choctaw Nation.

In 1902, the Choctaw Land Commission selected a new site along the railroad that was being constructed across what would become McCurtain County, Oklahoma. The  site, which would reclaim the name Garvin, was halfway between Valliant and Purnell (later renamed Idabel). The new Garvin began to develop rapidly. The first newspaper to serve that part of the country was the Garvin Graphic, which began publishing in 1903. A school opened in September, 1904, with an enrollment of 50 students. A cotton gin began operation in the same year. In 1905, Garvin had a telephone system. Garvin had a population of 800 in 1906, 15 stores had opened by then and several professional people (e.g., doctors and lawyers) had established practices.

Statehood had caused the dissolution of the Choctaw Nation as a political entity, replaced by the creation of several counties of the new state of Oklahoma. Garvin fell within the boundaries of McCurtain County. Idabel was chosen as the county seat, although Garvin then had the larger population. Its economic base was forest products, because of the dense forests in its vicinity. The town had several wood processing businesses, creating job opportunities. There was a large sawmill, a veneering plant, a barrel hoop plant and a barrel stave plant. Whole logs could be shipped to other markets over several miles of a tramway that led south toward the Red River. Garvin's population rose to a peak of 957 in 1910, then dropped to only 293 at the 1920 census. Garvin never regained its previous growth.  Meanwhile, its local rival, Idabel had surged ahead to a 1910 population of 1,493 and continued growth, with a total of 3,067 residents in 1920.

Geography
Garvin is located at  (33.954888, -94.941513).

Demographics

As of the census of 2000, there were 143 people, 53 households, and 39 families residing in this town. There were 57 housing units at an average density of 187.8 per square mile (73.4/km2). The racial makeup of the town was 88.11% White, 9.09% Native American, and 2.80% from two or more races.

There were 53 households, out of which 34.0% had children under the age of 18 living with them, 58.5% were married couples living together, 11.3% had a female householder with no husband present, and 26.4% were non-families. 22.6% of all households were made up of individuals, and 9.4% had someone living alone who was 65 years of age or older. The average household size was 2.70 and the average family size was 3.15.

In the town, the population was spread out, with 33.6% under the age of 18, 4.9% from 18 to 24, 32.2% from 25 to 44, 18.2% from 45 to 64, and 11.2% who were 65 years of age or older. The median age was 32 years. For every 100 females, there were 93.2 males. For every 100 females age 18 and over, there were 93.9 males.

The median income for a household in the town was $29,375, and the median income for a family was $30,833. Males had a median income of $23,125 versus $19,375 for females. The per capita income for the town was $11,633. There were 8.3% of families and 10.0% of the population living below the poverty line, including 16.3% of under eighteens and 27.3% of those over 64.

Notable people
 Blanche Barrow, born Bennie Caldwell, was married to Buck Barrow, who was the brother of Clyde, of the Bonnie and Clyde gang during the Great Depression in the early-mid 1930s.

 Jack Ridley was an aeronautical engineer, USAF test pilot and chief of the U.S. Air Force's Flight Test Engineering Laboratory. He helped develop and test many Cold War era military aircraft. He worked on the Bell X-1, the first aircraft to achieve supersonic flight.

Notes

References

External links
 Encyclopedia of Oklahoma History and Culture - Garvin

Populated places established in 1894
Towns in McCurtain County, Oklahoma
Towns in Oklahoma